The Battle of Krusi was fought on 22 September 1796 between the campaigning army of Ottoman Empire commanded by Kara Mahmud Pasha, the Pasha of Scutari, and tribes of Prince-Bishopric of Montenegro under the command of Metropolitan Petar I Petrović Njegoš and Jovan Radonjić, at Krusi, Lješanska nahija.

Prelude
After Kara Mahmud Pasha was defeated at Martinići (1796), he planned new operations to subdue Montenegro. With his main army in Scutari, Kara Mahmud Pasha advanced to Podgorica. In the meantime, near the Montenegrin borders, a rather large number of forces were stationed due to the concentration of attacks towards Montenegro and Brda. From Podgorica, the Pasha's forces moved onto Lješkopolje because his goal was to use the Lješkopolje-Krusi-Carev laz-Rijeka Crnojevića line to his advantage in order to carry out a raid toward Cetinje.

Petar I was informed of the Pasha's plans, and had managed to organize a defence. He took the larger part of his army and camped beneath the Sađavce mountain on the right bank of the Matica river. Another large unit under the command of Jovan Radonjić camped under the Busovnika mountain near the village of Krusi. One of the early accounts of the battle authored by Archimandrite Stefan Vukčević in 1811.

Battle
The battle occurred on 3 October 1796 when Bushati ordered his troops to cross the right hand bank of the Sitnica River and attack Montenegrin positions. Krusi was directly in the path of his army.

Half of the Montenegrin army was led by Metropolitan Petar I, and the other half by Jovan Radonjić.

The earliest historical sources about this battle include records of Russian deacon Aleksije, at that time scribe of Petar I. Deakon Aleksije wrote that both Petar I and Radonjić were armed and wore uniform and that 500 chosen soldiers also wore uniforms. According to deakon Aleksije, the battle started at 8:30 am and lasted until evening. After a whole day of fighting, the Montenegrins were able to defeat the Ottoman army. Bushati was killed by the Montenegrin army during the battle. Legend has it that it was a Bogdan Nikolić from Zalazi who managed to kill Bushati. The remains of the defeated Ottoman army were forced to withdraw to Podgorica. According to voivode Mirko, the Ottomans had 7,000 killed men. Vučetić presents figure of 32 dead and 64 wounded Montenegrin soldiers. Deakon Arsenije presents probably more realistic figures of 132 dead and 237 wounded Montenegrin soldiers.

Aftermath
The first report about the victory of Montenegrins was written by Metropolitan Petar I to Ivan Osterman, the Chancellor of the Russian Empire. In that report Petar I expressed his gratitude for support of Russia and its empress, proudly stating that his forces killed Scutari governor and captured 33 Ottoman flags, large number of light weapon and plenty of ammunition.

With the victory, the tribes of Bjelopavlići and Piperi were joined into the Montenegrin tribal assembly. The independence of Montenegro, though not officially internationally recognized emerged from the victory in this battle, which allowed proclamation of the first constitutional act of Montenegro - The General Code of Montenegro and the Highlands (.

The Ottoman defeat at Battle of Krusi weakened the Ottoman rule in Slavic populated territories in the region. On the other hand, it prevented secession of Albania from the Ottoman Empire reducing it to simple renegade actions.

See also
Battle of Martinići
Battle of Lopate

References

Sources 
 
 
 
 
 
 
 

Krusi
Krusi
Krusi
Krusi
1796 in Europe
1796 in the Ottoman Empire
Prince-Bishopric of Montenegro
Krusi